Tavriya is a 1959 Soviet drama film directed by Yuriy Lysenko. Based on the novel of the same name by Oles Honchar.

Plot 
Taurida Governorate,  Falz-Fein steppe empire. The fates of the two friends Vusti and Hanna are different: Vostya fell in love with the revolutionary Leonid Bronnikov and she herself decided to follow his path. Hanna's dream is to become rich. She falls in love with the son of the Falz-Fein  millionaires. But the maid fails to become a mistress: the landowner Sophia Falz-Fein drives Hanna out of the estate. Hard working conditions at work in the landlord economies give rise to solidarity and strong friendship between Russians and Ukrainians. They rebel against their oppressor landowner Falz-Fein.

Cast 
 Dmitriy Kapka as old man Levko
 Maria Kapnist as Hegumeness 
 Olga Lysenko as Vustya
 Yuri Maksimov as Leonid Bronnikov
 Ivan Ryzhov as Mokeich
 Larisa Shepitko as Ganna
 Oleg Zhakov as Ivan Timofeevich Murashko
 Natalia Gitserot as  Sophia Falz-Fein

References

External links 
 

1959 films
1950s Russian-language films
Soviet drama films
1959 drama films
Dovzhenko Film Studios films
Films based on Russian novels